EverBank, now TIAA Bank, is an American diversified financial services company providing banking, mortgages, and investing services. It is based in Jacksonville, Florida, U.S. It operates through standard banking offices and through its Direct Banking division. EverBank Direct operates by telephone, mail, and over the Internet. As of September 30, 2015, EverBank had approximately $25.2 billion in total assets.
 
On August 8, 2016, TIAA reached a deal to buy EverBank for $2.5 billion in cash. This announcement, made around two weeks after EverBank stated it was in talks to be acquired, will see stockholders receive $19.50 per share in cash. TIAA's acquisition of EverBank was complete on June 12, 2017. As of June 4, 2018, EverBank Financial Corp is now known as TIAA Bank.

History
While the roots of EverBank stretch back to 1961, the current incarnation was formed in 1994 when Chairman Robert Clements led an investor group in acquiring Jacksonville, Florida–based Alliance Mortgage Company. In 1998, Alliance Mortgage Company formed First Alliance Bank in Jacksonville, Florida. In 2001, First Alliance Bank acquired Marine National Bank, also of Jacksonville, Florida. In 1999, Frank Trotter and partners led an investor group to found EverBank.

The World Markets division of EverBank originated as a department of Mark Twain Bank, a St. Louis, Missouri, bank. In 1997, Mark Twain Bank was acquired by Mercantile Bank. EverBank acquired the world currency division from Mercantile Bank in April 1999.

In 2001, Everbank was named 'Best of the Web' by Forbes.

On November 5, 2002, First Alliance Bank acquired EverBank and on February 2, 2004, the company took the name EverBank and EverHome.

In May 2007, EverBank agreed to acquire NetBank's direct banking and small business financing divisions and mortgage servicing portfolio. On 17 September 2007, Everbank announced that it was terminating this agreement, claiming that NetBank had been unable to comply with provisions regarding certain cash levels due to the 2007 subprime mortgage financial crisis.In 2008, Florida Trend magazine described EverBank as being one of the nation's largest online banks.

In 2009, a class action lawsuit was filed against EverBank in the Superior Court of California on behalf of purchasers of the bank's Icelandic Krona foreign currency denominated "CDs". The lawsuit alleged that EverBank, against the instructions of its customers, closed the "CDs" at an unreasonable exchange rate, resulting in a loss of much of the "CD" purchasers' principal. Judge Richard Seeborg in San Jose granted EverBank summary judgment on all of the lawsuit's claims, finding that EverBank had the discretion to close the CDs because it would have been on the hook for approximately $12 million in losses had the currency not recovered. A federal appeals court remanded the case to district court in 2014 to determine if the bank breached the terms and conditions when it returned the value of the CDs to the class members.

On May 28, 2010, EverBank announced that it had acquired all the deposits, substantially all of the assets, and certain liabilities of the Bank of Florida from the Federal Deposit Insurance Corporation (the "FDIC"), bringing its total assets to approximately $11.5 billion.

In 2016, Everbank had a 4 out of 5 star rating from Bauer Financial.

On June 9, 2017, TIAA, a financial services provider, announced the completion of its acquisition of EverBank Financial Corp and its wholly owned subsidiary EverBank. The transaction was originally announced August 8, 2016. On June 4, 2018, TIAA announced the launch of TIAA Bank, bringing together EverBank and TIAA Direct under a new name and brand.

EverBank's products include high-interest checking, money market accounts and CDs, in addition to FDIC-Insured deposits denominated in foreign currency. EverBank participates in the Certificate of Deposit Account Registry Service (CDARS). The institution refunds ATM fees paid by checking account holders.

Community involvement
EverBank/EverHome Mortgage has sponsored between 25 and 52 homes in the Jacksonville's Habitat for Humanity program (HabiJax), contributing more than $1 million since beginning the partnership in 1995.

Everbank partnered with The Bridge of Northeast Florida for a year-round program called "Fast Path" that provided mentors, financial literacy classes and summer jobs to 15 students each years.

Everbank also had partnerships with University of North Florida.

Jacksonville Jaguars

On July 26, 2010, the Florida Times-Union reported that EverBank purchased the naming rights to Jacksonville Municipal Stadium. The stadium has been known as EverBank Field since the 2010 season.

On July 25, 2014, EverBank extended the naming rights of the stadium until 2024.

On June 4, 2018, EverBank became TIAA Bank and the stadium was renamed to TIAA Bank Field.

References

External links
EverBank's Website
Lawsuit Website
Bank Profile at the FDIC (Cert. 34775)
Summary of deposits

 
TIAA
Former investment banks of the United States
Companies listed on the New York Stock Exchange
Financial services companies established in 1998
Banks established in 1998
Companies based in Jacksonville, Florida
Online banking
Defunct banks of the United States
Banks based in Jacksonville, Florida
1998 establishments in Florida